The 33rd World Cup season began in October 1998 in Sölden, Austria, and concluded in March 1999 at the World Cup finals at Sierra Nevada, Spain. The overall winners were Lasse Kjus of Norway, his second, and Alexandra Meissnitzer of Austria, her first.

A break in the schedule was for the World Championships, held 2–14 February in the United States at Vail and Beaver Creek, Colorado.

Two-time (and defending) World Cup overall winner Katja Seizinger from Germany missed the entire season due to a severe knee injury suffered in June 1998. She retired in April 1999 at age 26 with eleven season titles (two overall, four downhill, and five super-G).

Calendar

Men

Ladies

Men

Overall

Downhill

Super G

Giant Slalom

Slalom

Combined

Ladies

Overall

Downhill

Super G

Giant Slalom

Slalom

Combined

References

External links
FIS-ski.com - World Cup Standings - 1999

1998–99
World Cup
World Cup